Queen's First E.P. is the first extended play by British rock band Queen. It was released on 20 May 1977 by EMI Records. The album consists of four tracks, one from each of their four most recent albums up to that point, with "Good Old-Fashioned Lover Boy" as the lead track.

Music video 
In 1977, Queen filmed a promotional video for "Good Old-Fashioned Lover Boy" in the Top of the Pops studios. The music video featured a drastically different arrangement of the song.

Commercial performance 
Queen's First E.P. entered the UK Singles Chart at number 36 in the week ending 4 June 1977, peaking at number 17 in early July.

Release and reception

Jim Allen of AllMusic wrote that Queen's First E.P. "is a four-song affair featuring one song apiece from A Night at the Opera, A Day at the Races, Sheer Heart Attack, and Queen II. "Tenement Funster", sung by drummer Roger Taylor, is a slice of Bowie-ish glam rock. "White Queen" is a prog-tinged epic ballad. "Good Old-Fashioned Lover Boy" taps into the lighter, music-hall side of Queen, and the scabrous hard rocker "Death on Two Legs" finds the band baring its fangs a bit."

Queen's First E.P. was reissued on CD in 1988 on the CD Single box set through Parlophone Records. In November 2008, it was made available as part of the limited edition CD box set The Singles Collection Volume 1.

On 18 April 2009, the EP was reissued on CD as a part of Record Store Day 2009.

Track listing
All lead vocals by Freddie Mercury, except "Tenement Funster", sung by Roger Taylor.

Charts

Release history

References

External links 
 
 
  
 

1977 debut EPs
Queen (band) albums